Vermont Route 25 (VT 25) is a  north–south state highway in Orange County, Vermont, United States. It begins at the New Hampshire state line in Bradford, continuing across the Connecticut River as New Hampshire Route 25, and ends in Orange at U.S. Route 302 (US 302).

Route description
VT 25 begins at the New Hampshire state line just south of the village of Bradford. The road continues across the state line at the Connecticut River as New Hampshire Route 25. Soon after, VT 25 has an interchange with Interstate 91 at Exit 16, then an intersection with VT 25B, a spur route leading from southbound VT 25 towards Bradford village. VT 25 continues in a northwest direction, following the path of the Waits River. It travels through mainly rural areas, passing through the small settlements of Bradford Center and East Corinth. VT 25 crosses the Waits River near the Corinth-Topsham town line, where it continues following the river through the communities of Waits River and West Topsham. VT 25 continues about  after crossing into the town of Orange, where it ends at an intersection with U.S. Route 302.

History

Vermont Route 25 used to be known as New England Route 25A, an alternate route of New England Route 25 from Topsham through Bradford. It connected back to the main New Hampshire section of Route 25 via an overlap with New Hampshire Route 10. Within Vermont, the main route of New England Route 25 was assigned in 1926 to U.S. Route 2. At the same time, Vermont renumbered 25A to 25. In 1935, US 2 in Vermont was relocated to a more northerly alignment and the former New England Route 25 was redesignated as U.S. Route 302.

Major intersections

Suffixed routes

Vermont Route 25A

Vermont Route 25A (VT 25A) in Fairlee is the  westward extension of New Hampshire Route 25A. It does not intersect VT 25; it is only related to VT 25 because of NH 25.

Vermont Route 25B

Vermont Route 25B (VT 25B) is a  spur of southbound VT 25 towards the village of Bradford, which VT 25 bypasses. VT 25B ends at U.S. Route 5.  It was named VT 25B because VT 25A already exists.

See also

References

External links

 

025
Transportation in Orange County, Vermont
Bradford, Vermont
Orange, Vermont